Elliot is a coastal hamlet in the county of Angus, Scotland, on the westernmost edge of Arbroath on the A92 road. The Elliot Water reaches the North Sea at Elliot.

In 1906 Elliot Junction station (now demolished) was the site of a major railway accident in which 22 passengers were killed.

The hamlet is served by the X7 Coastrider bus.

References

Villages in Angus, Scotland